The 2013 Colonial Athletic Association women's basketball tournament was held March 14–17 at the Show Place Arena in Upper Marlboro, Maryland. Champion Delaware University received an automatic bid to the 2013 NCAA tournament.

Schedule

Bracket

See also
 2013 CAA men's basketball tournament

References

CAA women's basketball tournament
Colonial Athletic Association women's basketball tournament
CAA women's basketball tournament
CAA women's basketball tournament
Basketball competitions in Maryland
Women's sports in Maryland
College sports tournaments in Maryland